Jan Apell and Peter Nyborg were the defending champions, but did not participate this year.

Stéphane Simian and Kenny Thorne won the title, defeating Kent Kinnear and Sébastien Lareau 6–4, 3–6, 7–5 in the final.

Seeds

  David Adams /  Andrei Olhovskiy (first round)
  Jonas Björkman /  Patrick Rafter (semifinals)
  Brett Steven /  Sandon Stolle (quarterfinals)
  Kent Kinnear /  Sébastien Lareau (final)

Draw

Draw

References
Draw

Seoul Open
1994 ATP Tour
1994 Seoul Open